Curie's Principle, or Curie's Symmetry Principle, is a maxim about cause and effect formulated by Pierre Curie in 1894: "the symmetries of the causes are to be found in the
effects".

The idea was based on the ideas of Franz Ernst Neumann and B. Minnigerode. Thus, it is sometimes known as the Neuman–Minnigerode–Curie Principle.

References 

Scientific method
Group theory